The Crosstown Freeway can refers to three different freeways in the US state of California:
 Crosstown Freeway (San Francisco) refers to a never-built freeway through Glen Canyon Park
 Crosstown Freeway (San Bernardino) refers to a segment of Route 210 in San Bernardino.
 Crosstown Freeway (Stockton) refers to a segment of State Route 4 which was built in the 1970s

See also
Crosstown Expressway